The 2012–13 Howard Bison basketball team represented Howard University during the 2012–13 NCAA Division I men's basketball season. The Bison, led by third year head coach Kevin Nickelberry, played their home games at the Burr Gymnasium and were members of the Mid-Eastern Athletic Conference. They finished the season 7–24, 4–12 in MEAC play to finish in eleventh place. They lost in the first round of the MEAC tournament to Delaware State.

Roster

Schedule

|-
!colspan=9| Regular season

|-
!colspan=9| 2013 MEAC men's basketball tournament

References

Howard Bison men's basketball seasons
Howard
Howard
Howard